JBQ may refer to:

 La Isabela International Airport (IATA code JBQ)
 Jewish Bible Quarterly